Omatako Dam is an earth-fill embankment dam about  north of Okahandja in the Otjozondjupa Region of Namibia. It is named after the Omatako Mountains, and it dams the ephemeral Omatako River, with Omatako meaning "butt" in Oshiwambo, the name referring to the shape of the Omatako Mountains.

Completed in 1981, it was originally envisaged to become part of the Eastern National Water Carrier, a scheme to supply water to Namibia's capital Windhoek from the Okavango River,  to the north on the Angolan border. The scheme was never completed. Omatako Dam today only contains floods and supplies water to the Von Bach Dam. As such, it is one of three dams supplying the capital Windhoek with water.

References

Okahandja
Dams in Namibia
Dams completed in 1981
1981 establishments in South West Africa
Buildings and structures in Otjozondjupa Region
Earth-filled dams